Mo' Bop II is an album by guitarist Kazumi Watanabe. It was released in 2004 and features only two other members in the lineup, besides Watanabe. The album is part of a project called "New Electric Trio" which began in 2003 with Mo' Bop and continued till 2006 with Mo' Bop III. The album is characterized by a heavy fusion sound.

Track listing
 "Cleopatra's Dream" 6:08
 "Blue Spiral" 7:40
 "Mystic Sand" 5:53
 "Mosaic Stone" 7:22
 "Dante’s Point" 10:10
 "Cry Me A River" 5:06
 "Death Valley" 8:22
 "Havana" 3:44
 "Favor Return of Ensyu Swallow" 5:04

Personnel
Kazumi Watanabe - guitars
Richard Bona - electric Fretted and Fretless Bass
Horacio Hernandez - drums, percussion

2004 albums
Kazumi Watanabe albums